The Malagasy giant chameleon or Oustalet's chameleon (Furcifer oustaleti) is a large species of chameleon which is endemic to Madagascar, but also has been introduced near Nairobi in Kenya (though its current status there is unclear). It occurs in a wide range of habitats, even among degraded vegetation within villages, but is relatively rare in the interior of primary forest.

Description
The head bears a high casque with several crests, and a dorsal crest consisting of 45 or more small triangular spines, runs along the spine. The colouring is quite variable, usually being largely grey or brown, with females often being more colourful than males. There is a line of large scales and may be a row of four large circles running along the flanks.

Distribution and habitat
F. oustaleti is endemic to Madagascar. It is found in a number of different habitat types including dry deciduous forest, humid evergreen forest and montane savanna, including degraded forests, land cleared for agriculture and even urban settings. It is seldom found deep in the forest interior, but more on the edges.

Diet
The diet of F. oustaleti includes invertebrates such as large insects as well as some vertebrates such as small birds and reptiles. This is also one of several chameleon species that are known to consume fruit. F. oustaleti is known to regularly consume the fruit of Grangeria porosa, Chassalia princei, and Malleastrum gracile, and will do so even during the wet season, suggesting that fruit is not consumed just to obtain water. Typically, prey is acquired with a long, muscular tongue, while fruit is seized directly with the jaws, but occasional exceptions to this rule have been recorded. In one unusual case however, this species was recorded grasping fruit bearing twigs with the zygodactyl feet and bringing them closer for consumption. Amongst reptiles, this level of food manipulation with the forelimbs is otherwise only documented in some species of monitor lizards and Chamaeleo namaquensis. The latter is also known to feed on plants.

Etymology

The generic name, Furcifer, is derived from the Latin root  meaning "forked" and refers to the shape of the animal's feet.

The specific name, is a Latinized form of the last name of French biologist Jean-Frédéric Émile Oustalet, in whose honor the species is named.

References

Furcifer
chameleon
chameleon
Reptiles described in 1894
Taxa named by François Mocquard